Washington Capitol may refer to:

 Washington State Capitol in Olympia, Washington, United States
 United States Capitol in Washington, District of Columbia, United States
 Washington Capitols,  Basketball Association of America team based in Washington, D.C.

See also

 Washington Capitals